Max Muay Thai is a stadium and organizer of Muay Thai based in Pattaya, Thailand broadcast from its own stadium on Channel 8 every Sunday. The promotion has been credited for elevating the level of entertainment of Muaythai and to have modernized the way it was presented in the Thailand. The stadium was an important venue outside of the elite Muay Thai scene in Bangkok. After a fire destroyed the stadium, operations ceased in December 2020.

History 
The Max Muaythai Stadium was opened in November 2014 under the management of Mr. Nawat Thaochareeonsuk and Mr. Piyachart Srichan. Unlike the weekly Muay Thai programs from Rajadamnern Stadium and Lumpinee Stadium, Max Muay Thai reduced the length of its matches to 3-rounds bouts and added ring girls more commonly seen in western promotions. In 2018, after the separation of the Channel 8 TV coverage team from Max Muay Thai, a new competitor named Super Champ Muay Thai was launched in Bangkok. Channel 8 is the official broadcaster of the promotion, televised every Sunday. After a fire destroyed the stadium, the promotion ceased operations in December 2020, but was expecting to re-start activities in 2022.

On February 18, 2016, a fire broke out at the Max Muay Thai Stadium in Pattaya and completely destroyed the venue causing damage estimated at 200 million Thai baht. It is believed that technicians were servicing the air-conditioning units in the back when the compressor exploded which started the fire. The incident left the Manager of the venue and 3 other staff with minor injuries and possible carbon monoxide poisoning. The stadium had no fire insurance.

Notable competitors 

  Liam Harrison
  Buakaw Banchamek
  Hamza Ngoto
  Nilmungkorn Sudsakorngym
  Sagetdao Petpayathai
  Andrei Kulebin
  Rodtang Jitmuangnon 
  Dylan Salvador
  Jomthong Chuwattana
  Mathias Gallo Cassarino
  Joseph Lasiri
  Yoshihiro Sato

See also
 Super Champ Muay Thai
 Kunlun Fight
 Pattaya Boxing World
 Lumpinee Stadium
 Rajadamnern Stadium
 Thai Fight 
 Sports broadcasting contracts in Thailand

References

External links

Professional Muay Thai organizations
Muay Thai in Thailand
Muay Thai competitions in Thailand
Kickboxing in Thailand
Sports organizations established in 2014
2014 establishments in Thailand
Television in Thailand
Entertainment companies of Thailand
Kickboxing organizations